Peyrou may refer to:
 Le Palais du Peyrou, a mansion in the city of Neuchâtel, Switzerland
 Porte du Peyrou, a triumphal arch in Montpellier, France
 Manuel Peyrou (1902–1974), an Argentine writer and journalist